Nussbaumersee is a small lake between Nussbaumen and Uerschhausen, both in the municipality of Hüttwilen in the Canton of Thurgau, Switzerland. Hüttwilersee and Hasensee are located in the same valley.

Nussbaumer See is or was also known as Nussbommersee, Werdsee or Wertsee, Uerschhauser See or unterer See (lower lake). Together with Hasensee they formed the Helfenberger Seen or Ittinger Seen.

External links
 Stiftung Seebachtal

Lakes of Switzerland
Lakes of Thurgau